Shetland West is one of the seven wards used to elect members of the Shetland Islands Council. It elects three Councillors.

Councillors

Election Results

2022 Election
2022 Shetland Islands Council election

2017 Election
2017 Shetland Islands Council election

2012 Election
2012 Shetland Islands Council election

2007 Election
2007 Shetland Islands Council election

References

Wards of Shetland